Limaria orientalis, common name the file shell, is a bivalve mollusc of the family Limidae, the file shells.  It is present in New Zealand.

References

Further reading
 Powell A. W. B., New Zealand Mollusca, William Collins Publishers Ltd, Auckland, New Zealand 1979 

Limidae
Molluscs of New Zealand